Federico Redondo Solari (born 18 January 2003) is an Argentine professional footballer who plays as an defensive midfielder for Argentinos Juniors. Born in Spain, he is a youth international for Argentina.

Career
Redondo is a youth product of the academy of Argentinos Juniors sinced the age of 10. He signed his first professional contract with them on 17 December 2021, keeping him at the club until December 2023. He debuted with Argentinos Juniors in a 2–1 Argentine Primera División win over Tigre on 11 July 2022, coming on as a substitute in extra time.

International career
Redondo was born in Spain, and is of Argentine descent, returning to Argentina at a young age. He is a youth international for Argentina, having represented the Argentina U20s in May 2022.

Personal life
Redondo is the son of the Argentine footballer Fernando Redondo, and his brother Fernando Redondo Solari was also briefly a professional footballer. Through his mother he is the grandson of the footballer Jorge Solari, and nephew of Eduardo Solari and Esteban Solari.

References

External links
 

2003 births
Living people
Footballers from Madrid
Argentine footballers
Argentina youth international footballers
Spanish footballers
Spanish people of Argentine descent
Association football midfielders
Argentinos Juniors footballers
Argentine Primera División players